Toby Joseph Turner (born March 3, 1985), also known by his stage name Tobuscus, is an American Internet personality and actor. Originally from Niceville, Florida, he is best known for his YouTube videos. As of November 5, 2021, Turner has a total of over 14.33 million subscribers and over 3.867 billion video views over his three YouTube channels.

Early life
Toby Joseph Turner was born on March 3, 1985, in Osborn, Mississippi, and grew up in Niceville, Florida. He attended the University of Florida, and having an interest in filmmaking, graduated with a degree in telecommunication production. Turner's mother later took out a loan and bought him a video camera, an act he appreciated, as it helped begin his YouTube career.

Career

YouTube
Turner has grown to become a popular personality on YouTube, achieving his early notability through his Tobuscus channel, and later through his secondary vlogging channel, as well as his gaming channel. Turner's style of content is often extroverted, rambling, and energetic, but he always avoids using severe profanity and censors any explicit content due to his target audience.

Aside from his channels, Turner also worked with Philip DeFranco on Like Totally Awesome (LTA) and Cute Win Fail, after befriending and being employed by DeFranco. LTA was a gaming and review channel that ran during the late 2000s and early 2010s. In 2010, Turner signed with the multi-channel network Machinima, before switching to Maker Studios in July 2013.

Main channel
Toby Turner first joined YouTube on May 14, 2006, when he created a channel under the name of "Tobuscus". The first video that remains on the channel is a sketch based on the 2006 film Click. One of Turner's earliest popular videos is "Don't Tase Me, Bro!", a remixed recording of the University of Florida Taser incident in which his classmate Andrew Meyer was stunned with a taser gun by a police officer. Interviewed about the video by MTV, Turner explained that, after watching the clip, "as soon as [he] heard [Andrew] yelling, [he] knew it would fit in a hip-hop song", and that he "wanted to give [Andrew] the profits" from sales of related merchandise. The Tobuscus channel has since continued to focus on comedic skits and animated sketches, achieving recognition for those such as "I Can Swing My Sword", "Safety Torch" and "Nugget In A Biscuit". Turner's Literal Trailers series is also one of his most popular, earning him mainstream recognition from CBS News, who described his rendition of the Dead Island trailer as "amazing" and "hilarious", and Wired, who praised Turner's Literal Trailer of Iron Man 3.

Vlogging and gaming channels
In April 2009, Turner began using his "TobyTurner" channel to upload daily unedited vlogs detailing his personal life, which he dubbed "lazy vlogs." In July 2010, Turner registered his fourth (third in use) YouTube channel under the name "TobyGames", designating it for a new series of comedic Let's Play videos. The channel has featured playthrough videos of numerous indie and AAA games since its inception, including the long-running Minecraft and Happy Wheels series.

Collaborations

In addition to producing his own original content over three channels, Turner has worked together with a wide range of other YouTube personalities on various projects. In 2009 he performed a guitar collaboration with Joe Penna (MysteryGuitarMan) using two separate videos played simultaneously; in 2010 he made an appearance on the fifth episode of The Annoying Orange, titled "A Cheesy Episode"; in early 2011 he worked with iJustine on a number of LittleBigPlanet 2 Let's Play videos; since 2011 he has worked on many projects with Jack Douglass, including parody "Tobjackscus", sketch "Dubstep Tobuscus", and music videos "Take Off Your Clothes (Like Scarlett Johansson)", "Razors in Your Apple (On Halloween)", and "The Valentine's Day Song"; and in 2012 he starred in a short with Olga Kay entitled Olga Kay Goes Haywire., as well as starring in an episode of the YouTube series, "Retarded Policeman". Tobuscus has also appeared alongside notable celebrities on several occasions, including the music video for the song "Whistle While I Work It", featuring Chester See and Wayne Brady, as well as starring in a three-parter YouTube series "Terminator Genisys: The YouTube Chronicles" to promote the film Terminator Genisys. A range of well-known personalities were involved in the series, including Arnold Schwarzenegger himself, and YouTube stars such as Lilly Singh, Olga Kay, Sean Klitzner, Epic Lloyd, The Warp Zone, and Kevin Lieber.

Aside from these works, Turner has also presented a web series called CuteWinFail, created by Turner and co-produced with Philip DeFranco and his production company FishBowl Worldwide Media, since its inception in October 2010, although in November 2012 his involvement ended after 100 episodes of the show. He also works as a host on Tagged, a gaming-themed YouTube series produced by NODE Studios, and plays the Satan character in the Fine Brothers web series MyMusic.

Film and television
Turner's first feature-length film role came in 2010 romantic comedy film New Low, in which he played stand-up comedian Dave, the best friend of main character Wendell played by writer, producer and director Adam Bowers. The film was premiered at the Sundance Film Festival in January 2010, before it received coverage at the Austin Film Festival in October and at the Glasgow Film Festival the following February, and was later released on DVD in 2012. Later, in 2012, he starred in psychological horror film Smiley, written and directed by Michael Gallagher and starring fellow YouTube partner Shane Dawson. Turner also starred alongside Dawson in the 2015 comedy Bob Thunder: Internet Assassin and played a minor role in the 2015 film The Great Gilly Hopkins.

From 2012–2014, Turner starred in the Cartoon Network animated series The High Fructose Adventures of Annoying Orange. Turner played Nerville, the only human character who can interact with the fruits.

Sexual assault allegations
On April 8, 2016, Turner's ex-girlfriend April Fletcher, known online as AprilEfff, made several allegations against the YouTuber, including that he was addicted to drugs, that he had cheated on several of his former partners (including Fletcher), and that he drugged and raped her in February 2013. Writing a blog post on Tumblr, Fletcher claimed that she had contemplated suicide following the episodes, and that Turner had likely committed the same acts to other women. YouTuber and ex-girlfriend of Turner, Amelia Talon, corroborated Fletcher's accounts shortly after, alleging that she had been drugged by Turner as well. On April 9, 2016, Jaclyn Glenn, another of Turner's ex-girlfriends, posted a video on YouTube responding to the allegations. Glenn claimed that Turner had affairs in their relationship, and that while she thought the rape allegations were possible, she personally believed that they were untrue. Former Turner girlfriends Olga Kay and Melanie Murphy both denied that they were ever assaulted by Turner, though Murphy admitted Turner was not faithful to her. While not endorsing the rape allegations, both former Turner girlfriend Tara Babcock and former collaborator with Turner, Philip DeFranco, attested that Turner has a drug problem, is non-monogamous in his relationships and needs mental help.

Turner responded to the accusations on April 11, 2016. In a short video, he dubbed Fletcher's claims as "false" and claimed that he had "never done anything without her consent [and] never tried to trick her into anything".

On June 14, 2018, Turner released another video titled "#MeToo ...late?" where he claims he was advised not to say anything when the Tumblr post was published, then proceeds to give his accounts of what happened. In the video he insists nothing wrong occurred that night, just him letting a friend (Fletcher) sleep over at his house, due to her insisting she was too afraid to return home that late at night. He also claims that Fletcher wanted a romantic relationship with him, while he wanted only to remain friends. In the video, Turner also suggests Fletcher hinted at making a Tumblr post falsely accusing him of rape.

As a result of the allegations, Turner was replaced as the voice of Ant-Man/Scott Lang for Marvel Avengers Academy.

Other work
Aside from video production and other entertainment, Toby Turner – who is described on his official website as a "viral marketer ... [and] consultant for viral video and social media platforms" – has worked with a number of major companies on advertising campaigns, including NBC, Disney, and others. Among his online commercial credits are adverts for Fox crime drama series Lie to Me, footwear manufacturer and retailer Timberland, snack food product Pop-Tarts, and social network aggregation website Ouibox.

Turner has also secured hosting roles for a number of events and series, including reporting on the Toshiba "Set Me Free Tour" for MTV in August 2009 and presenting holiday special web shows for Comedy Central, Spike and VH1. In December 2012, Turner was nominated for the award of Best Host at the 2013 Streamy Awards, although eventually lost out to KassemG.

In May 2013, Turner set up a fundraising campaign on crowdfunding website Indiegogo for an iOS (and later Android) game based on his Tobuscus Adventures YouTube series, called Tobuscus Adventures: Wizards!. The fundraiser surpassed its goal of $240,000 within two days, reaching more than $644,000. The game features Turner as main character Tobuscus as he fights off hordes of zombies to get to the Wizard of Darkness, and also cameos Gabe Hohreiter as Gabuscus, and Turner's dog Gryphon. The game was released in March 2015 for iOS and later for Android, and in May 2018 for PC, with plans to extend this to PlayStation 4, Xbox One, and Nintendo Switch. Before the release of Tobuscus Adventures: Wizards!, Turner also revealed that a second, albeit smaller game, was in development at the same time and based on the popular sandbox game Minecraft, titled "Mine The Diamond", which was later released in June 2015 for iOS.

In May 2014, Turner signed a three-book deal with Tegen Books, an imprint of HarperCollins, to help create an illustrated journal-style series based on Tobuscus Adventures. The first, second, and third books were published in the fall of 2015, summer of 2016, and winter 2017, respectively. As of 2018, Turner had written a fourth book in the series.

Turner was chosen to voice the character of Ant-Man/Scott Lang for the 2016 mobile game Marvel Avengers Academy.

Reception
Within the first few years of his three channels running concurrently, Turner was considered one of the most popular YouTube personalities, later recognised as a "mainstay", "pioneer", and "one of the site's greatest innovators." Turner has on occasion expressed how his channels have suffered from management issues on YouTube that ultimately restricts how many video views he receives. For example, in an interview with Heavy in 2018 and a video uploaded in 2019 titled Dear Algorithm, he stated that content creators such as himself were occasionally not appearing in subscribers feeds and as a result the majority of his subscribers were not notified when he uploaded new content. Turner has also attempted to reach out to YouTube directly, such as in 2017 tweeting to their administration that neither the subscribe button nor the more recently introduced bell icon, which immediately notified subscribers of new uploads, were working properly at the time.

Harrison Jacobs of Business Insider in 2014 meanwhile wrote of how Turner had been pursuing various projects outside of YouTube. He found that while he still published frequently to his channels, he seemed particularly devoted to other work in the hope that it could direct him into more "traditional media", citing Turner's first book based on his web series Tobuscus Animated Adventures, as well as his mobile game Tobuscus Adventures: Wizards!. Jacobs noted how the development of the game, which ultimately took place over an almost two-year period, had run over-budget, despite having received more than double the requested funds, and had been met with a number of delays, which Turner himself ascribed to a lack of experience.

Personal life
Having begun his video-making career in Niceville, Turner moved to Los Angeles in 2008. Turner has speculated that he may have ADHD and some have similarly made this assumption due to his boisterous and sometimes inappropriate behavior.

Filmography

References

External links

1985 births
American comedy musicians
21st-century American comedians
American male television actors
American male video game actors
American male voice actors
American male web series actors
21st-century American male actors
American YouTubers
Living people
Musicians from Florida
People from Niceville, Florida
People from Oktibbeha County, Mississippi
Maker Studios channels
University of Florida College of Journalism and Communications alumni
Video bloggers
Video game commentators
Web series producers
Male bloggers
The Annoying Orange
Minecraft YouTubers